Fore Holm is the name of three of the Shetland Islands.

 Fore Holm, Weisdale Voe between Reawick and Hoy, Shetland
 Forewick Holm off Papa Stour
 Crown Dependency of Forvik, a micronation located here